Norris A. Patterson (1917 – May 10, 2000) was an American football coach and college athletics administrator. He served as the head football coach at William Jewell College in Liberty, Missouri from 1950 to 1967, compiling a record of 133–33–9. He coached Bill Snyder, who played as a defensive back at William Jewell from 1959 to 1962, later served as head football coach at Kansas State University, and was inducted into the College Football Hall of Fame in 2015. Patterson was also the athletic director at William Jewell from 1950 to 1968 and United States International University—now known as Alliant International University—in San Diego, California from 1969 to 1975.

A native of Odessa, Missouri, Patterson attended Missouri Valley College in Marshall, Missouri, where he played college football under head coach Volney Ashford. He also lettered in basketball and baseball. Following his graduation, he taught and coached in Trenton and Marshall, Missouri. Patterson served for four years in the United States Navy during World War II as a gunnery officer and was promoted to the rank of lieutenant commander.

After returning from the war, Patterson became the head football coach at Excelsior Springs High School in Excelsior Springs, Missouri, where he led his teams to a record of 36–3 in four seasons. In 1949, he moved to Danville High School in Danville, Illinois, where his team was 8–1 that season. In December of that year, he was hired as head football coach and athletic director at William Jewell.

Patterson stepped down as football coach and athletic director at William Jewell in 1968 and took a role as coordinator of special projects with the school. In early 1969, he was named director of athletic and psychical education at United States International University. In addition to his bachelor's degree from Missouri Valley College, Patterson earned a master's degree from the University of Kansas City—now known as the University of Missouri–Kansas City and a doctorate in education from Columbia University.

Patterson died at the age of 82, on May 10, 2000, at Liberty Hospital in Liberty, Missouri.

Head coaching record

College football

See also
 List of college football coaches with a .750 winning percentage

References

External links
 

1917 births
2000 deaths
American men's basketball players
Missouri Valley Vikings baseball players
Missouri Valley Vikings football players
Missouri Valley Vikings men's basketball players
United States International Gulls athletic directors
William Jewell Cardinals athletic directors
William Jewell Cardinals baseball coaches
William Jewell Cardinals football coaches
High school football coaches in Illinois
High school football coaches in Missouri
United States Navy personnel of World War II
United States Navy officers
Teachers College, Columbia University alumni
University of Missouri–Kansas City alumni
People from Odessa, Missouri
Coaches of American football from Missouri
Players of American football from Missouri
Baseball coaches from Missouri
Baseball players from Missouri
Basketball players from Missouri